Ireland competed at the 1980 Summer Olympics in Moscow, USSR. 47 competitors, 44 men and 3 women, took part in 38 events in 11 sports. In partial support of the American-led boycott of the 1980 Summer Olympics, Ireland competed under the Olympic Flag instead of its national flag.

Medalists

Silver
 David Wilkins and James Wilkinson — Sailing, Flying Dutchman class

Bronze
 Hugh Russell — Boxing, Men's Flyweight

Archery

In Ireland's second appearance in archery competition at the Olympics, the nation was represented by two men and one woman.  The men included Ireland's only veteran from 1976, James Conroy.  It was Hazel Greene, however, who posted the nation's best results.

Women's Individual Competition:
 Hazel Greene — 2229 points (→ 19th place)

Men's Individual Competition:
 William Swords — 2212 points (→ 31st place)
 James Conroy — 2058 points (→ 37th place)

Athletics

Men's 1,500 metres
Ray Flynn
 Heat — 3:42.0 (→ did not advance)

Men's 5,000 metres
 Eamonn Coghlan
 Heat — 13:45.4
 Semi Final — 13:28.8
 Final — 13:22.8 (→ 4th place)

 John Treacy
 Heat — 13:44.8
 Semi Final — 13:40.3
 Final — 13:23.7 (→ 7th place)

 Mick O'Shea
 Heat — 14:03.0 (→ did not advance)

Men's 10,000 metres
John Treacy 
 Heat — did not finish (→ did not advance)

Men's Marathon
 Dick Hooper
 Final — 2:23:53 (→ 38th place)

 Pat Hooper
 Final — 2:30:28 (→ 42nd place)

 John Treacy
 Final — did not start (→ no ranking)

Men's Hammer Throw
Seán Egan 
 Qualification — 63.94 m (→ did not advance, 16th place)

Boxing

Men's Light Flyweight (– 48 kg)
 Gerard Hawkins
 First Round — Bye
 Second Round — Lost to Ismail Mustafov (Bulgaria) on points (0-5)

Men's Flyweight (– 51 kg)
 Hugh Russell →  Bronze Medal
 First Round — Defeated Samir Khiniab (Iraq) on points (5-0)  
 Second Round — Defeated Emmanuel Mlundwa (Tanzania) on points (5-0) 
 Quarter Finals — Defeated Yo Ryon-Sik (North Korea) on points (3-2) 
 Semi Finals — Lost to Petar Lesov (Bulgaria) on points (0-5)

Men's Bantamweight (– 54 kg)
 Philip Sutcliffe
 First Round — Bye
 Second Round — Lost to Daniel Zaragoza (Mexico) on points (0-5)

Men's Featherweight (– 57 kg)
 Barry McGuigan
 First Round — Bye
 Second Round — Defeated Issack Mabushi (Tanzania) after referee stopped contest in third round
 Third Round — Lost to Winfred Kabunda (Zambia) on points (1-4)

Men's Lightweight (– 60 kg)
 Sean Doyle
 First Round — Defeated Nelson René Trujillo (Venezuela) after referee stopped contest in second round
 Second Round — Lost to Florian Livadaru (Romania) after referee stopped contest in first round

Men's Light-Welterweight (– 63,5 kg)
 Martin Brerton
 First Round — Lost to José Aguilar (Cuba) after referee stopped contest in first round

Canoeing

Cycling

Three cyclists represented Ireland in 1980.

Individual road race
 Billy Kerr
 Stephen Roche
 Tony Lally

Judo

Modern pentathlon

Three male pentathletes represented Ireland in 1980.

Individual Competition:
 Jerome Hartigan — 4.557 pts 39th place
 Sackville Currie — 4.377 42nd place 
 Mark Hartigan — 4.361 pts, 43rd place

Team Competition:
 Hartigan, Currie, and Hartigan — 13.295pts 12th place

Rowing

Men's Coxless Pairs
 Pat Gannon — 1st B Final (→ 7th)
 Willie Ryan — 1st B Final (→ 7th)

Men's Coxed Pairs
 Denis Rice — 5th B Final (→ 11th)
 Christy O'Brien — 5th B Final (→ 11th)
 Liam Williams — 5th B Final (→ 11th)

Men's Coxed Fours
 Iain Kennedy — 5th B Final (→ 11th)
 Pat McDonagh — 5th B Final (→ 11th)
 Ted Ryan — 5th B Final (→ 11th)
 Davey Gray — 5th B Final (→ 11th)
 Noel Graham — 5th B Final (→ 11th)

Women's Single Sculls
 Frances Cryan — 1st B Final (→ 7th)

Sailing

 David Wilkins and James Wilkinson — Flying Dutchman class

Shooting

Swimming

Men's 100m Freestyle
 David Cummins
 Heats — DNS (→ no ranking)

Men's 200m Freestyle
 David Cummins
 Heats — DNS (→ no ranking)

 Kevin Williamson
 Heats — 1.57,37 (→ did not advance)

Women's 100 m Breaststroke
Catherine Bohan
 Heats — 1:16.84 (→ did not advance)Women's 400 m Individual Medley'''
Catherine Bohan
 Heats — 5:21.82 (→ did not advance)

References

Nations at the 1980 Summer Olympics
1980
1980 in Irish sport